was a town located in Jōbō District, Okayama Prefecture, Japan.

As of 2003, the town had an estimated population of 8,188 and a density of 64.18 persons per km2. The total area was 127.58 km2.

On October 1, 2004, Kayō, along with the town of Kamogawa (from Mitsu District), was merged to create the town of Kibichūō (in the newly created Kaga District).

Dissolved municipalities of Okayama Prefecture